Sea of Lost Ships is a 1953 American adventure film directed by Joseph Kane and starring John Derek, Wanda Hendrix and Walter Brennan. It is a tribute to the US Coast Guard.

Plot
The son of a deceased Coast Guard hero is raised by a Coast Guard NCO, who also has a son the same age. When they get older both are accepted into the Coast Guard Academy, but the hero's son winds up being thrown out, bringing disgrace to his adopted family.

Cast
 John Derek as G.R. 'Grad' Matthews
 Wanda Hendrix as Pat Kirby
 Walter Brennan as C.P.O 'Chief' O'Malley
 Richard Jaeckel as H.G. 'Hap' O'Malley
 Tom Tully as captain Holland
 Barton MacLane as Capt. Jack Matthews
 Erin O'Brien-Moore as Mrs. Nora O'Malley
 Ben Cooper as 3rd Plane Crewman 
 Darryl Hickman as Pete Bennett
 Roy Roberts as 'Eagle' Captain
 Tom Powers as Rear Admiral
 Richard Hale as Capt. Welch
 James Brown as Ice Patrol official
 Douglas Kennedy as Helicopter Pilot 
 Steve Brodie as Lt. Rogers 
 John Hudson as Pilot

Production
Filming was to have started 15 December 1952. However it was pushed back until April 1953 as Steve Fisher rewrote the script. John Derek was borrowed from Columbia Pictures to play the lead. (After filming completed, Derek asked for – and was given – release from his Columbia contract.)

References

External links

1953 films
American adventure films
Films about the United States Coast Guard
Films directed by Joseph Kane
1953 adventure films
American black-and-white films
1950s English-language films
1950s American films